Kareha is a Japanese word meaning "dried leaves." It may refer to:

 Koreisha mark, a mark put on Japanese cars to indicate that the driver is elderly, which also called "Kareha mark".
 Kareha (Shuffle!), a character in the Shuffle! video game series.
 Kareha, a popular 2channel-style anonymous board software package.
 Japanese name of a French song "Les Feuilles mortes". See Autumn Leaves (1945 song)